Marcus Whitley may refer to:

Marcus Whitley (political candidate), see Claiborne County, Mississippi
Marcus Whitley, character in 12 Monkeys (TV series)